Hirtomurex nakamurai is a species of sea snail. It is a marine gastropod mollusk, in the family Muricidae, which are the murex snails or rock snails.

Distribution
This species is found in the New Zealand Exclusive Economic Zone.

References

nakamurai
Gastropods described in 1985